This is a list of successful votes of no confidence in Italian governments, which resulted in their resignation or dismissal. It includes both governments who served under the Kingdom of Italy and governments who served under the Republic of Italy. The first such vote took place on 19 December 1865, while the most recent one took place on 28 January 2008.

Practice

Kingdom of Italy 
The Kingdom of Italy was a constitutional monarchy, in which the Council of Ministers, which exercised executive power, was appointed by the King and required parliamentary confidence in order to remain in office. Although the Italian Parliament was bicameral, being composed of both a Senate and a Chamber of Deputies (with bills needing the approval of both before becoming law), by convention the government only needed the support of the latter.

Republic of Italy 
Under the Constitution of Italy, the government is appointed by the President and can only remain in office as long as it enjoys the confidence of both houses of Parliament.

List

Kingdom of Italy

Republic of Italy

Notes

References 

Defeated by votes of no confidence